Adventures of the Bengal Lancers (also known as Three Sergeants of Fort Bengal) is a 1964 Italian-Spanish adventure film directed  by Umberto Lenzi  (here credited as Humphrey Humbert)  and starring Richard Harrison and Dakar.

Plot
Three British soldiers stationed in Malaysia are sent to Fort Madras to help the commandant fight off an elusive bandit who is terrorizing the countryside.

Cast
Richard Harrison as Sgt. Frankie Ross 
Wandisa Guida as Mary Stark 
Ugo Sasso as Burt Wallace (credited as Hugo Arden) 
Nazzareno Zamperla as Sgt. John Foster (credited as Nick Anderson) 
Andrea Bosic as  Col. Lee McDonald 
Luz Márquez as  Helen 
Aldo Sambrell as  Gamal / Sikki Dharma 
José Uria
Marco Tulli 
Dakar

References

External links

Adventures of the Bengal Lancers at Variety Distribution

Italian adventure films
Spanish adventure films
1964 adventure films
1964 films
Films directed by Umberto Lenzi
British Empire war films
Films set in the British Raj
Films scored by Giovanni Fusco
1960s Italian-language films
1960s Italian films